Kantilal Desai may refer to:

 Kantilal Ranchhodji Desai (1932–2016), an Indian cricketer
 Kantilal Thakoredas Desai (1903–1977), the second Chief Justice of the High Court of Gujarat